The 3rd Grenadier Division was an infantry unit in the Imperial Russian Army as part of the Grenadier Corps. Its headquarters was located at Moscow.

Organization 
 1st Brigade
 2nd Brigade

Commanders 
 1877–1884: Mikhail Pavlovich Danilov
 1884–1889: Nikolai Yakovlevich Zverev
 1892–1894: AA Chelishev
 1905–1909: Yakovlev
 1909–1914: Vladimir Gorbatovsky
 1914–1916: Kisielewski

Chiefs of Staff 
 1885–1886: Nikolay F Meshetich
 1914: Vladimir Yegoryev

Commanders of the 2nd Brigade 
 1816–1821: Yevgeny Golovin
 1889–1892: Golubev

Infantry divisions of the Russian Empire
Moscow Governorate